Harpalus aogashimensis is a species of ground beetle in the subfamily Harpalinae. It was described by Habu in 1957.

References

aogashimensis
Beetles described in 1957